In mathematics, a Laguerre plane is one of the three types of Benz plane, which are the Möbius plane, Laguerre plane and Minkowski plane.  Laguerre planes are named after the French mathematician  Edmond Nicolas Laguerre.

The classical Laguerre plane is an incidence structure that describes the incidence behaviour of the curves  , i.e. parabolas and lines, in the real affine plane. In order to simplify the structure, to any curve   the point  is added. A further advantage of this completion is that the plane geometry of the completed parabolas/lines is isomorphic to the geometry of the plane sections of a cylinder (see below).

The classical real Laguerre plane 

Originally the classical Laguerre plane was defined as the geometry of the oriented lines and circles in the real Euclidean plane (see ). Here we prefer the parabola model of the classical Laguerre plane.

We define:

 the set of points,
 the set of cycles.

The incidence structure  is called classical Laguerre plane.

Any parabola/line  gets the additional point  .

Points with the same x-coordinate cannot be connected by curves . Hence we define:

Two points  are parallel

For the description of the classical real Laguerre plane above two points  are parallel if and only if .  is an equivalence relation, similar to the parallelity of lines.

The incidence structure  has the following properties:

Lemma:
 For any three points , pairwise not parallel, there is exactly one cycle  containing .
 For any point  and any cycle  there is exactly one point  such that .

Similar to the sphere model of the classical Moebius plane there is a cylinder model for the classical Laguerre plane:

The following mapping  is a projection with center  that maps the x-z-plane onto the cylinder with the equation , axis  and radius 

The points  (line on the cylinder through the center) appear not as images. 
 projects the  parabola/line with equation  into the plane . So, the image of the parabola/line is the plane section of the cylinder with a non perpendicular plane and hence a circle/ellipse without point . The parabolas/line  are mapped onto (horizontal) circles.
A line(a=0) is mapped onto a circle/Ellipse through center  and a parabola onto a circle/ellipse that do not contain .

The axioms of a Laguerre plane

The Lemma above gives rise to the following definition:

Let   be an incidence structure with point set  and set of cycles . 
 is called Laguerre plane if the following axioms hold:

B1: For any three points , pairwise not parallel, there is exactly one cycle  that contains .

B2: For any point  and any cycle  there is exactly one point  such that .

B4: Any cycle contains at least three points. There is at least one cycle. There are at least four points not on a cycle.

From the definition of relation  and axiom B2 we get

Lemma:
Relation  is an equivalence relation.

Following the cylinder model of the classical Laguerre-plane we introduce the denotation:

a) For  we set .
b) An equivalence class  is called generator.

For the classical Laguerre plane a generator is a line parallel to the y-axis (plane model) or a line on the cylinder (space model).

The connection to linear geometry is given by the following definition:

For a Laguerre plane    we define the local structure
 

and call it the  residue at point P.

In the plane model of the classical Laguerre plane   is the real affine plane  .
In general we get

Theorem: Any residue of a Laguerre plane is an affine plane.

And the equivalent definition of a Laguerre plane:

Theorem:
Laguerre plane if and only if for any point  the residue  is an affine plane.

Finite Laguerre planes

The following incidence structure is a "minimal model" of a Laguerre plane:
 
 
 
Hence  and 

For finite Laguerre planes, i.e. , we get:

Lemma:
For any cycles  and any generator  of a finite Laguerre plane
 we have:
 .

From combinatorics we get

Lemma:
Let  be a Laguerre—plane of order . Then
a) any residue  is an affine plane of order   b)   c) 

Miquelian Laguerre planes

Unlike Moebius planes the formal generalization of the classical model of a Laguerre plane, i.e. replacing  by an arbitrary field , always leads to an example of a Laguerre plane.

Theorem:
For a field   and
  ,
 the incidence structure
 is a Laguerre plane with the following parallel relation:  if and only if .

Similarly to a Möbius plane the Laguerre version of the Theorem of Miquel holds:

Theorem of Miquel:
For the Laguerre plane  the following is true:

If for any 8 pairwise not parallel points  that can be assigned to the vertices of a cube such that the points in 5 faces correspond to concyclical quadruples then the sixth quadruple of points is concyclical, too.
(For a better overview in the figure there are circles drawn instead of parabolas)

The importance of the Theorem of Miquel shows in the following theorem, which is due to v. d. Waerden, Smid and Chen:

Theorem: Only a Laguerre plane  satisfies the theorem of Miquel.

Because of the last theorem  is called a "Miquelian Laguerre plane".

The minimal model of a Laguerre plane is miquelian.

A suitable stereographic projection shows that  is isomorphic to the geometry of the plane sections on a quadric cylinder over field .

Ovoidal Laguerre planes 
There are many Laguerre planes that are not miquelian (see weblink below). The class that is most similar to miquelian Laguerre planes is the ovoidal Laguerre planes. An ovoidal Laguerre plane is the geometry of the plane sections of a cylinder that is constructed by using an oval instead of a non degenerate conic. An oval is a quadratic set and bears the same geometric properties as a non degenerate conic in a projective plane: 1) a line intersects an oval in zero, one, or two points and 2) at any point there is a unique tangent. A simple oval in the real plane can be constructed by glueing together two suitable halves of different ellipses, such that the result is not a conic. Even in the finite case there exist ovals (see quadratic set).

See also
 Laguerre transformations

References

External links
 Benz plane in the Encyclopedia of Mathematics''
Lecture Note Planar Circle Geometries, an Introduction to Moebius-, Laguerre- and Minkowski Planes, pp. 67

Planes (geometry)